Charmoille is a village and a former municipality in the district of Porrentruy in the canton of Jura in Switzerland. On 1 January 2009 it became part of the new municipality of La Baroche.

References

External links

Former municipalities of the canton of Jura